Utran Gas Based Power Station is located at bank of Tapi River near Surat city, in Surat district in the Indian state of Gujarat. The power plant is one of the gas based power plants of Gujarat State Electricity Corporation Limited.

Capacity

References

Natural gas-fired power stations in Gujarat
Surat district
Energy infrastructure completed in 1992
1992 establishments in Gujarat